Saeed Ahmed Saeed (born 24 November 1968) is an Emirati chess International Master.

Chess career
Saeed Ahmed Saeed won the 1981 Under-14 World Chess Championship held in Xalapa.

In 1985 in Taxco he participated in the World Chess Championship Interzonal Tournament where ranked in 15th place.

Saeed Ahmed Saeed played for Emirati in the Chess Olympiads:
 In 1980, at second board in the 24th Chess Olympiad in La Valletta (+7, =4, -3),
 In 1984, at first board in the 26th Chess Olympiad in Thessaloniki (+7, =4, -3).

Saeed Ahmed Saeed played for Emirati in the Men's Asian Team Chess Championships:
 In 1979, at second board in the 3rd Asian Team Chess Championship in Singapore (+6, =0, -2).

Saeed Ahmed Saeed was awarded the Chess International Master (IM) title. He is member of Dubai Chess and Culture Club.

References

External links

Saeed Ahmed Saeed chess games at 365Chess.com

1967 births
Living people
Emirati chess players
Chess International Masters
Chess Olympiad competitors